Microcos is a genus of flowering plants in the family Malvaceae sensu lato or Tiliaceae or Sparrmanniaceae.

Species
Plants of the World Online lists:

 Microcos africana (Hook.f.) Burret
 Microcos antidesmifolia (King) Burret
 Microcos argentata Burret
 Microcos barombiensis (K.Schum.) Cheek
 Microcos bifida Burret
 Microcos borneensis Burret
 Microcos branderhorstii Burret
 Microcos brassii Summerh.
 Microcos calophylla Burret
 Microcos calymmatosepala (K.Schum.) Burret
 Microcos ceramensis Burret
 Microcos cerasifera Chiov.
 Microcos chrysothyrsa Burret
 Microcos chungii (Merr.) Chun
 Microcos cinnamomifolia Burret
 Microcos conocarpa Burret
 Microcos conocarpoides (Burret) Burret
 Microcos coriacea Burret
 Microcos crassifolia Burret
 Microcos dulitensis Airy Shaw
 Microcos erythrocarpa (Ridl.) Airy Shaw
 Microcos fibrocarpa (Mast.) Burret
 Microcos floribunda (Mast.) Burret
 Microcos florida (Miq.) Burret
 Microcos globulifera (Mast.) Burret
 Microcos gossweileri Burret
 Microcos gracilis Stapf ex Ridl.
 Microcos grandiflora Burret
 Microcos grandifolia (Pulle) Burret
 Microcos havilandii Ridl.
 Microcos henrici (Baker f.) Burret
 Microcos heterotricha (Mast.) Burret
 Microcos hirsuta (Korth.) Burret
 Microcos impressinervia Merr.
 Microcos inflexa (Merr.) Burret
 Microcos kinabaluensis R.C.K.Chung
 Microcos lanceolata (Miq.) Burret
 Microcos latifolia Burret
 Microcos latistipulata (Ridl.) Burret
 Microcos laurifolia (Hook.f. ex Mast.) Burret
 Microcos ledermannii Burret
 Microcos loerzingii Burret
 Microcos magnifica Cheek
 Microcos malacocarpa (Mast.) Burret
 Microcos malayana R.C.K.Chung
 Microcos membranifolia R.C.K.Chung
 Microcos microthyrsa (K.Schum. ex Burret) Burret
 Microcos mildbraedii (Burret) Burret
 Microcos oligoneura (Sprague) Burret
 Microcos opaca (Korth.) Burret
 Microcos ossea Burret
 Microcos pachyphylla Merr.
 Microcos paniculata L.
 Microcos paucicostata Burret
 Microcos pearsonii (Merr.) Burret
 Microcos peekelii Burret
 Microcos pentandra Burret
 Microcos phaneroneura Burret
 Microcos philippinensis (G.Perkins) Burret
 Microcos pinnatifida (Mast.) Burret
 Microcos psilonema Burret
 Microcos reticulata Ridl.
 Microcos riparia (Boerl. & Koord.-Schum.) Burret
 Microcos saccinervia Burret
 Microcos schlechteri Burret
 Microcos seretii (De Wild.) Burret
 Microcos sinuata (Wall. ex Mast.) Burret
 Microcos stauntoniana G.Don
 Microcos stylocarpoides Burret
 Microcos subcordifolia R.C.K.Chung
 Microcos subepetala Stapf ex Ridl.
 Microcos sumatrana (Baker f.) Burret
 Microcos tetrasperma Merr. & L.M.Perry
 Microcos tomentosa Sm.
 Microcos triflora (Blanco) R.C.K.Chung
 Microcos ugandensis (Sprague) Burret
 Microcos urbaniana (Lauterb.) Burret
 Microcos vitiensis A.C.Sm.

References

 
Malvaceae genera
Taxonomy articles created by Polbot